The 1987–88 Villanova Wildcats men's basketball team represented Villanova University in the 1987–88 season.  The head coach was Rollie Massimino.  The team played its home games at The Pavilion in Villanova, Pennsylvania, and was a member of the Big East Conference.

Roster

Schedule

|-
!colspan=9 style="background:#013974; color:#67CAF1;"| Non-conference regular season

|-
!colspan=9 style="background:#013974; color:#67CAF1;"| Big East Conference regular season

|-
!colspan=9 style="background:#013974; color:#67CAF1;"| Non-conference regular season

|-
!colspan=9 style="background:#013974; color:#67CAF1;"| Big East Conference regular season

|-
!colspan=9 style="background:#013974; color:#67CAF1;"| Non-conference regular season

|-
!colspan=9 style="background:#013974; color:#67CAF1;"| Big East Conference regular season

|-
!colspan=9 style="background:#013974; color:#67CAF1;"| Non-conference regular season

|-
!colspan=9 style="background:#013974; color:#67CAF1;"| Big East Conference regular season

|-
!colspan=9 style="background:#013974; color:#67CAF1;"| Non-conference regular season

|-
!colspan=9 style="background:#013974; color:#67CAF1;"| Big East tournament

|-
!colspan=9 style="background:#013974; color:#67CAF1;"| NCAA tournament

Awards and honors
 Doug West, 2nd Team All-Big East
 Doug West, 1st Team All-Big East tournament
 Doug West, NCAA Tournament All-Southeast Region
 Mark Plansky, 3rd Team All-Big East
 Mark Plansky, 1st Team All-Big East tournament
 Tom Greis, 3rd Team All-Big East
 Kenny Wilson, NCAA Tournament All-Southeast Region
 Gary Massey, Big East Defensive Player of the Year

Team players drafted into the NBA

References 

Villanova Wildcats men's basketball seasons
Villanova
Villanova
Villanova
Villanova